Auchmophanes platysara is a species of moth of the family Erebidae first described by Turner in 1929. It is found in the Australian state of Queensland.

References

Moths described in 1929
Hypeninae